Like Sugar may refer to:

 "Like Sugar", a 2019 song by Chaka Khan from Hello Happiness
 "Like Sugar", a 2012 song by Matchbox Twenty from North